Ciluprevir was a drug used experimentally in the treatment of hepatitis C. It is manufactured by Boehringer Ingelheim and developed under the research code of BILN 2061. It was the first-in-class NS3/4A protease inhibitor to enter clinical development and tested in human. Ciluprevir is a potent competitive reversible inhibitor of NS3/4A protease from HCV genotype 1a (Ki = 0.3 nM) and 1b (Ki = 0.66 nM). It shows good selectivity for NS3 protease against representative serine and cysteine proteases, human leukocyte elastase and cathepsin B (IC50 > 30 μM).

Its development was halted in phase Ib clinical trials because of toxicity in animals. However, ciluprevir scaffold was exploited to design new macrocyclic inhibitors such as simeprevir (TMC-435) and danoprevir.

References 

Abandoned drugs
NS3/4A protease inhibitors